Vikentije I Stefanović was Archbishop of Peć and Serbian Patriarch for a short time during 1758.

During the Habsburg rule in the Kingdom of Serbia (1718–1739), Vićentije served as archdeacon of Metropolitan Vikentije Jovanović of Belgrade (1731-1737). After Ottoman reconquest of Belgrade in 1739, Vikentije Stefanović decided to stay in Serbia, and rose through ecclesiastical ranks, becoming Metropolitan of Belgrade in 1753, under Serbian Patriarch Gavrilo III. Between 1755 and 1758, patriarch Gavrilo III was challenged by several rivals and finally lost the patriarchal throne. From that turmoil, metropolitan Vikentije finally emerged as new Serbian Patriarch. His tenure was very short. Upon arriving to Constantinople, he was struck with sudden illness and died. His successor was Metropolitan of Užice and Valjevo Pajsije, who traveled with him to Constantinople, becoming new Serbian Patriarch as Pajsije II.

References

Sources

External links
 Official site of the Serbian Orthodox Church: Serbian Archbishops and Patriarchs

Vikentije I
Metropolitans of Belgrade
18th-century Serbian people
Serbs from the Ottoman Empire
1758 deaths